Gordon Dwight "Jack" Mohr (January 1, 1916 – July 17, 2003), was a Christian Identity author and preacher who is considered to be an influential figure in the Christian Patriot movement.

Early life and military service
Gordon Dwight Mohr was born in Chicago on January 1, 1916.

Mohr enlisted in the United States Army during the early days of World War II. He retired in 1964 as a Lieutenant Colonel.

Far-right militia movement
Mohr was the leader of the Citizens Emergency Defense System, a paramilitary group exclusive to White Christians. The group was considered to be a militant subgroup of the Christian Patriots Defense League - an anti-Semitic survivalist organization based in the state of Illinois.

Views and writings

The majority of Mohr's works expressed anti-communist, anti-Semitic and anti-Masonic views.

Additionally, Mohr was a promoter of Christian Identity religion and The Protocols of the Elders of Zion, a fabricated anti-semitic text purporting to describe a Jewish plan for global domination. Mohr wrote for many publications, including his own Christian Patriot Crusader. One 1986 article has been linked by political opponents to a Seattle man who, after failing to arrange a meeting with Mohr, went on to murder a family of four.

References

1916 births
2003 deaths
Place of death missing
Writers from Chicago
Christian Identity
United States Army officers
American white supremacists
Anti-Masonry
Military personnel from Illinois